Sis Hopkins may refer to:
 Sis Hopkins (1919 film), a comedy film
 Sis Hopkins (1941 film), an American comedy film